This article lists the most visited museums in the United Kingdom (including art galleries). The first twenty museums show the 2020 attendance numbers of the members of the Association of Leading Visitor Attractions unless otherwise noted. The other museums show 2019 figures from the same source.

See also
 Museum of the Year
 Tourism in the United Kingdom
 List of museums in the United Kingdom
 List of most visited art museums 
 List of most-visited museums

References

United Kingdom
Most Visited
Tourism in the United Kingdom
Tourist attractions in the United Kingdom
United Kingdom-related lists of superlatives
Museums in the United Kingdom